The John Templeton Foundation (Templeton Foundation) is a philanthropic organization that reflects the ideas of its founder, John Templeton, who became wealthy via a career as a contrarian investor, and wanted to support progress in religious and spiritual knowledge, especially at the intersection of religion and science. He also sought to fund research on methods to promote and develop moral character, intelligence, and creativity in people, and to promote free markets. In 2008, the foundation was awarded the National Humanities Medal. In 2016 Inside Philanthropy called it "the oddest—or most interesting—big foundation around."

Templeton founded the organization in 1987 and headed it as chairman until his death in 2008. Templeton's son, John Templeton Jr., served as its president from its founding until his death in 2015, at which point Templeton Jr.'s daughter, Heather Templeton Dill, became president. The foundation administers the annual Templeton Prize for achievements in the field of spirituality, including those at the intersection of science and religion.  It has an extensive grant-funding program (around $150 million per year as of 2016) aimed at supporting research in physics, biology, psychology, and the social sciences as well as philosophy and theology. It also supports programs related to genetics, "exceptional cognitive talent and genius" and "individual freedom and free markets". The foundation has received both praise and criticism for its awards, regarding both the breadth of their coverage, and ideological perspectives asserted to be associated with them.

Leadership
John Templeton (29 November 1912 – 8 July 2008) was an American-born British investor, banker, fund manager, and philanthropist. In 1954, he entered the mutual fund market and created the Templeton Growth Fund. According to a 2011 profile of the foundation:

Like many of his generation, Templeton was a great believer in progress, learning, initiative and the power of human imagination — not to mention the free-enterprise system that allowed him, a middle-class boy from Winchester, Tennessee, to earn billions of dollars on Wall Street. ... Unlike most of his peers, however, Templeton thought that the principles of progress should also apply to religion. He described himself as "an enthusiastic Christian" — but was also open to learning from Hinduism, Islam and other religious traditions. Why, he wondered, couldn't religious ideas be open to the type of constructive competition that had produced so many advances in science and the free market?

These were the values he sought to promote first through the Templeton Prize which he started in 1972 and then through the foundation, which he founded in 1987 and ran until his death in 2008.

John Templeton Jr. was president of the foundation from its inception in 1987 and worked as a pediatric surgeon; he was chief of pediatric surgery at Children's Hospital of Philadelphia in 1995, when he stopped practicing medicine to join the foundation. He took over as chairman when his father died. He was an evangelical Christian and supported various American conservative causes. He always maintained that he tried to run the foundation according to his father's wishes instead of his own wishes. He died in 2015.

Heather Templeton Dill, the daughter of John Templeton Jr., became president in 2015.

Endowment
Templeton bequeathed around $500 million to the foundation when he died in 2008.  the foundation's total endowment had grown to $3.34 billion. The foundation reports that it has issued over 3,300 grants, with over 2,800 of those going to recipients in North America. In 2016, the foundation disbursed over $151,000,000 in grants.

Prizes

The Templeton Prize was established by John Templeton and he administered the prize until the foundation was established in 1987, which took it over. The prize has "a value of about $1.7 million, making it one of the world’s largest annual awards given to an individual".

The early prizes were given solely to people who had made great achievements in the field of religion; Mother Teresa received the inaugural award in 1973, with other early winners including Sir Sarvepalli Radhakrishnan (1975), Chiara Lubich (1977), and Nikkyō Niwano (1979). In the 1980s, John Templeton began considering the intersection of science and religion, and after he appointed two scientists to the judging panel, scientists who worked at the intersection began receiving it; Alister Hardy was the first, in 1987. More recent winners of the Templeton Prize have included the Dalai Lama in 2012, King Abdullah II of Jordan in 2018, Brazilian Jewish physicist and astronomer Marcelo Gleiser in 2019, and primatologist Jane Goodall in 2021.

Grants
Templeton "was a great believer in progress, learning, initiative and the power of human imagination—not to mention the free-enterprise system". While most of its funding goes to topics in science, philosophy, and religion, around 40 percent of its annual grants go to character development, genius, freedom and free enterprise, and fields associated with classical liberalism. Grants are given to people across all religions, since Templeton believed progress in the field of spirituality could come from anywhere. The field of grants was broadened in the 1980s to include scientific fields like neuroscience, psychology, and cosmology, that could be seen as being at the intersection of science and religion.

Some research programs supported by the foundation have included the development of positive psychology by Martin Seligman, Angela Duckworth and others; the Black Hole Initiative at Harvard University; the Gen2Gen Encore Prize; the World Science Festival; Pew religious demographics surveys; and programs that engage with Buddhist, Jewish, Muslim, Hindu, Orthodox, Catholic, and Protestant traditions, including support for dialogue with scientists in synagogues, and a grant for advancing scientific literacy in madrasas.

, the foundation has awarded nearly a billion dollars in grants and charitable contributions, and was the 55th largest grantor among American foundations.

The top ten largest grants of 2018 were:

Physics

QISS (Quantum Information Structure of Spacetime
The John Templeton Foundation granted over two million dollars in 2019, and then 4.5 million dollars in 2022 to QISS.
The QISS consortium brings together specialists from quantum gravity, quantum information, foundations of quantum mechanics, as well Philosophy of Science to the physics of quantum spacetime on an information theoretical basis, bring within reach empirical access to quantum gravity phenomenology leveraging rapidly advancing quantum technologies, and promote interactions between physicists and philosophers. The broader goal of QISS is to establish a long term research program that brings together the  represented communities. Marios Christodoulou and Carlo Rovelli are the project leaders.

Black Hole Initiative
In 2016, the foundation granted over seven million dollars to the Black Hole Initiative (BHI), an interdisciplinary program at Harvard University that includes the fields of Astronomy, Physics and Philosophy, and is said to be the first center in the world to focus on the study of black holes. Notable principal participants include Sheperd Doeleman, Peter Galison, Avi Loeb, Ramesh Narayan, Andrew Strominger, and Shing-Tung Yau. The BHI Inauguration was held on 18 April 2016 and was attended by Stephen Hawking; related workshop events were held on 19 April 2016.

Complexity at the Santa Fe Institute
In 2015, the Santa Fe Institute was awarded a three-year, $2.5 million grant to support the development of a general theory of complexity, constituting "a concise, parsimonious, and potentially mathematizable framework for understanding complex adaptive systems".

Biology and human development

In 2016, the foundation awarded $5.4 million to the Foundation for Applied Molecular Evolution (FfAME) in order to study the origin of life on Earth, particularly investigating questions of how early RNA interacted with water, which is necessary for life but also degrades RNA, and how the introduction of energy to organic materials yielded life rather than turning it into tar. The project is headed by molecular biophysicist and chemist Steven A. Benner. The foundation also awarded an $8 million grant to a program examining a theory in evolutionary biology called extended evolutionary synthesis. This project is headed by evolutionary biologist Kevin Laland.

Several grants have specifically supported inquiry into various aspects of human evolution. A 2014 grant of $4.9 million supports an effort at Arizona State University by paleoanthropologist Donald Johanson to explore how we became human, and a $3.2 million grant to Indiana University and the Stone Age Institute supports the study of "what factors led human ancestors to develop skills like making tools, developing language, and seeking out information".

In March 2019, the foundation provided the bulk of a group of grants adding up to over $7 million to enable the Institute for Interdisciplinary Brain and Behavioral Science (The Brain Institute) at Chapman University to examine "how the human brain enables conscious control of decisions and actions".

A grant from the foundation supports a study of religion and health conducted by Tyler VanderWeele of Harvard University. VanderWeele is the John L. Loeb and Frances Lehman Loeb Professor of Epidemiology in the Departments of Epidemiology and Biostatistics at the Harvard T.H. Chan School of Public Health, and co-director the University's Initiative on Health, Religion and Spirituality. His research has focused on the application of causal inference to epidemiology, as well as on the relationship between religion and health.

In June 2019, the foundation awarded one of its largest grants to the Blavatnik Institute at Harvard Medical School for its Ancient DNA Atlas project that seeks to sequence the DNA of ancient human remains in order to tell the story of human migration and development through the addition of DNA sequences of 10,000 individuals spanning 50,000 years. The funding was used to solve a riddle that had puzzled historians, classicists, linguists, anthropologists and archaeologists for 200 years - whether the bulk of the European civilization had arrived from Anatolia or the Pontic Steppes of Central Asia, and how Indo-European languages spread over an enormous geographical area from Britain to India, becoming the largest linguistic group today.

The funding was used to embrace a multi-disciplinary approach and crowd-source results before the final manuscripts were completed, receiving commentary and feedback from academics of various institutions on several continents, according to geneticist David Reich, lead researcher on the project. The study was also funded by the governments of the US, Russia, Germany (Max Planck Institute), European Union and India. Results have been published in Science and Cell.

Social sciences

Pew Research Center

The Pew Research Center, an American fact tank or research organization, has been "jointly and generously funded" by The Pew Charitable Trusts and the foundation for its studies focusing on demographics of religions in the world, part of the series entitled Pew-Templeton Global Religious Futures.

Center on Religion and Chinese Society

The Center on Religion and Chinese Society of the Purdue University in Indiana is funded by the foundation. The current director of the center, the Chinese American Christian scholar Fenggang Yang, has been granted more than $9.5 million to support his projects, The center has published research on religion in China, especially based on Yang's own theory of the so-called "religious market", with speculations were based on a report of the Pew Research Center, another publication backed by the foundation. Some scholars of Chinese religion have criticized Yang's sociological theories about religion in China, although the New York Times has referred to Yang as "a pioneer in the study of the sociology of religion in China", and the Wall Street Journal has deemed him a "leading scholar on Chinese church-society relation".

Psychology

Positive psychology, religion and medicine

Harold G. Koenig, Dale Mathews, David Larson, Jeffrey Levin, Herbert Benson and Michael McCullough are scholars to whom the foundation has provided funds to "report the positive relations" between religion and medicine. One field in which the foundation has been particularly supportive is positive psychology, as developed by Martin Seligman, Angela Duckworth and others. Positive psychology is "the scientific study of  what makes life most worth living", or "the scientific study of positive human functioning and flourishing on multiple levels that include the biological, personal, relational, institutional, cultural, and global dimensions of life". Positive psychology is concerned with eudaimonia, "the good life", reflection about what holds the greatest value in life – the factors that contribute the most to a well-lived and fulfilling life. Positive psychology began as a new domain of psychology in 1998 when Seligman chose it as the theme for his term as president of the American Psychological Association.

Scientific development of virtue interventions
In 2019, the foundation awarded $2.6 million grant to Sarah Schnitker of Baylor University and Benjamin Houltberg of the University of Southern California to "galvanize widespread scientific development of virtue interventions for adolescents across a diversity of contexts".

A grant from the foundation supports a study of religion and health conducted by Tyler VanderWeele of Harvard University. VanderWeele is the John L. Loeb and Frances Lehman Loeb Professor of Epidemiology in the Departments of Epidemiology and Biostatistics at the Harvard T.H. Chan School of Public Health, and co-director the University's Initiative on Health, Religion and Spirituality. His research has focused on the application of causal inference to epidemiology, as well as on the relationship between religion and health.

Science education
The foundation has provided grants in support of dialogue with scientists in synagogues, and a grant for advancing scientific literacy in madrasas. It has also sponsored a major, multi-year, multi-million-dollar effort to integrate science education in North American seminaries, including Mainline Protestant, Evangelical Protestant, and Catholic and Orthodox institutions.

History
The foundation provided funding for the book Galileo Goes to Jail and Other Myths about Science and Religion, which was edited by historian of science Ronald Numbers.

Reception

The foundation has received both praise and criticism for its awards. The French National Center for Scientific Research (CNRS) has been critical of the foundation for funding "initiatives to bring science and religion closer together." Science journalist Chris Mooney, an atheist, received a 2010 Templeton-Cambridge Journalism Fellowship. In a 2010 article on his Discover magazine blog, Mooney wrote, "I can honestly say that I have found the lectures and presentations that we've heard here to be serious and stimulating. The same goes for the discussions that have followed them". 

Some scholars have expressed concerns about the nature of the awards, research projects, and publications backed by the foundation. These concerns include questioning its integrity, cronyism, and its Templeton Freedom Awards. Journalist Sunny Bains pointed out in 2011 that Templeton Freedom Awards are administered by the Atlas Economic Research Foundation, a group that opposes taking action on climate change and defends the tobacco industry, which also gives the foundation funding.

Religious funding

Critics have asserted that the foundation has supported Christian-oriented research in the field of the scientific study of religions, although the foundation has awarded both the Templeton Prize and numerous grants to persons of widely varied religious backgrounds, having provided extensive funding of Islamic scholarship, Buddhist research, and Jewish public engagement. Wired magazine has noted that "the scientists who apply to the foundation for support, though, are not required to state their religious beliefs, or to have any". In 2006, John Horgan, a 2005 Templeton-Cambridge fellow then working as a freelance science journalist, wrote in The Chronicle of Higher Education that he had enjoyed his fellowship, but felt guilty that by taking money from the foundation, he had contributed to the mingling of science with religion. Horgan stated "misgivings about the foundation's agenda of reconciling religion and science". He said that a conference he attended favored scientists who "offered a perspective clearly skewed in favor of religion and Christianity." Horgan fears recipients of large grants from the foundation sometimes write what the foundation wants rather than what they believe. Richard Dawkins, in his 2006 book The God Delusion, interprets Horgan as saying that "Templeton's money corrupts science", and characterizes the prize as going "usually to a scientist who is prepared to say something nice about religion". Donald Wiebe, scholar of religious studies at the University of Toronto, similarly criticized the foundation in a 2009 article entitled Religious Biases in Funding Religious Studies Research?. According to him, the foundation supports Christian bias in the field of religious studies, by deliberately imposing constraints to steer the results of the research.

Paul Davies, physicist and 1995 Templeton Prize laureate, gave a defense of the foundation's role in the scientific community in the Times Higher Education Supplement in March 2005. In 2010, journalist Nathan Schneider published a lengthy investigative article about the foundation, entitled God, Science and Philanthropy, in The Nation. In the article, he aired complaints about the foundation, but observed that many of its critics and grantees alike failed to appreciate "the breadth of the foundation's activities, much less the quixotic vision of its founder, John Templeton". Schneider observed: "At worst, Templeton could be called heterodox and naïve; at best, his was a mind more open than most, reflective of the most inventive and combinatorial strains of American religious thought, eager to radically reinterpret ancient wisdom and bring it up to speed with some version from the present." Though the foundation, in Schneider's view, "has associated itself with political and religious forces that cause it to be perceived as threatening the integrity of science and protecting the religious status quo," these alliances meant the foundation "is also better positioned than most to foster a conservatism—and a culture generally—that holds the old habits of religions and business responsible to good evidence, while helping scientists better speak to people's deepest concerns". In 2011, the science journal Nature took note of the ongoing controversy among scientists over working with Templeton. Jerry Coyne, University of Chicago evolutionary biologist, sees a fundamental impossibility in attempting to reconcile faith with science. Coyne told Nature writer Mitchell Waldrop that the foundation's purpose is to eliminate the wall between religion and science, and to use science's prestige to validate religion. Other scientists, including Foundation grantees like University of Chicago psychologist John Cacioppo and Anthony Aguirre, a University of California—Santa Cruz astrophysicist, told Nature that they have never felt pressured by Templeton to spin their research toward religion-friendly conclusions.

Sunny Bains of University College London Faculty of Engineering Science claimed that there is "evidence of cronyism (especially in the awarding in those million-dollar-plus Templeton prizes), a misleading attempt to move away from using religious language (without changing the religious agenda), [and] the funding of right-wing anti-science groups". Bains feels that grants from the foundation "blur the line between science and religion". Bains' claims have been disputed by Josh Rosenau of the National Center for Science Education, who wrote that "the story [Bains] wrote is not convincing", stating that "[k]ey assertions are couched in equivocal language that relies on her judgment or her assumptions, not on any evidence offered to the reader", and that "[o]bvious opportunities for detailed investigation – financial records, grantmaking decisions, interviews with Templeton staff, interviews with grantees, examination of correspondence between grantees and Templeton – are entirely absent".

Intelligent design

A 2007 article in the Los Angeles Times described the foundation as having "drawn criticism for its early support of intelligent design", but by the 2010s, Charles L. Harper Jr., a former senior vice president of the foundation, told BusinessWeek that the foundation had become one of the "principal critics" of the intelligent design movement and funded projects that challenged that movement. Harper Jr. told The New York Times: "From the point of view of rigor and intellectual seriousness, the intelligent design people don't come out very well in our world of scientific review".

Some organizations funded by the foundation in the 1990s gave book-writing grants to Guillermo Gonzalez and to William Dembski, proponents of intelligent design who later joined the Discovery Institute. The foundation also gave money directly to the Discovery Institute which in turn passed it through to Baylor University, which used the funds to support Dembski's salary at its short-lived Michael Polanyi Center. The foundation funded projects by Bruce L. Gordon, associate director of the center, after the center was dissolved. Some media outlets described the foundation as a supporter of intelligent design during the Kitzmiller v. Dover Area School District litigation in the mid-2000s, a charge which the foundation denied. The foundation "explicitly warns intelligent-design researchers not to bother submitting proposals: they will not be considered."

In March 2009, the Discovery Institute accused the foundation of blocking its involvement in Biological Evolution: Facts and Theories, a Vatican-backed, Templeton-funded conference in Rome. On the lack of involvement of any speakers supporting intelligent design, the conference director Rev. Marc Leclerc said, "We think that it's not a scientific perspective, nor a theological or philosophical one ... This makes a dialogue difficult, maybe impossible". In 2011, The Times stated that the Templeton Prize is "explicitly critical of such pseudoscientific gibberish as intelligent design".

Conservatism
A number of journalists have highlighted connections with conservative causes. A 1997 article in Slate written by David Plotz said the foundation had given a significant amount of financial support to groups, causes and individuals considered conservative, including gifts to Gertrude Himmelfarb, Milton Friedman, Walter E. Williams, Julian Lincoln Simon and Mary Lefkowitz, and called John Templeton Jr. a "sugar daddy" for such thinkers. The foundation also has a history of supporting the Cato Institute, a libertarian think-tank and The Heritage Foundation conservative think-tank, as well as projects at major research centers and universities such as Hernando de Soto's Instituto Libertad Y Democracia and the X Prize Foundation, which is described as "a nonprofit organization that designs and manages public competitions intended to encourage technological development that could benefit humanity".

In a 2007 article in The Nation Barbara Ehrenreich drew attention to the foundation's former president John M. Templeton Jr. funding of the conservative group Freedom's Watch, and referred to the foundation as a "right wing venture". Pamela Thompson, former Vice President of Communications of the foundation, replied that "the Foundation is, and always has been, run in accordance with the wishes of Sir John Templeton Sr, who laid very strict criteria for its mission and approach", that it is "a non-political entity with no religious bias" and it "is totally independent of any other organisation and therefore neither endorses, nor contributes to political candidates, campaigns, or movements of any kind".

Climate change denial 

Drexel University sociologist Robert Brulle listed the foundation as among the largest financial contributors to the climate change denial movement between 2003 and 2010.

Templeton Press
The foundation also funds an affiliated publisher, Templeton Press, which from 2004 to 2010 published the periodical In Character: A Journal of Everyday Virtues. From 2000 to 2003 it published Research news & opportunities in science and theology, in which Bruce L. Gordon published a piece on the state of "design theory" in the aftermath of the Michael Polanyi Center affair. Templeton Press has a partnership with the Yale University Press, producing books on character and on Foundational Questions in Science.

References

External links
 

 
Foundations based in the United States
Religion and science
Religious studies
Organizations established in 1987
Religious organizations based in the United States
National Humanities Medal recipients
Religion and medicine